Nabhachara Chamrassri (5 May 1884 – 31 August 1889), was the Princess of Siam (later Thailand). She was a member of the Siamese Royal Family. She was a daughter of Chulalongkorn.

Her mother was Saisavali Bhiromya, daughter of Prince Ladavalya, the Prince Bhumindra Bhakdi and Lady Chin. She was given her full name by her father as Nabhachara Chamrassri Bhadravadi Rajadhida (})

She had 3 siblings; an elder brother, and 2 younger sisters:
 Prince Yugala Dighambara, the Prince of Lopburi (17 March 1883 – 8 April 1932)
 Princess Malini Nobhadara, the Princess of Srisatchanalai (31 July 1885 – 22 December 1924)
 Princess Nibha Nobhadol, the Princess of Uthong (4 December 1886 – 29 January 1935)

Princess Nabhachara Chamrassri died in her childhood on 31 August 1889, at age 5.

Ancestry

1884 births
1889 deaths
19th-century Thai royalty who died as children
19th-century Chakri dynasty
Thai female Chao Fa
Children of Chulalongkorn
Daughters of kings